The women's 200 metres event at the 2016 IAAF World U20 Championships was held at Zdzisław Krzyszkowiak Stadium on 22 and 23 July.

Medalists

Records

Results

Heats
Qualification: First 4 of each heat (Q) and the 4 fastest times (q) qualified for the semifinals.

Wind:Heat 1: +0.6 m/s, Heat 2: +1.9 m/s, Heat 3: +1.2 m/s, Heat 4: +1.1 m/s, Heat 5: +0.5 m/s

Semifinals

Qualification: First 2 of each heat (Q) and the 2 fastest times (q) qualified for the final.

Wind:Heat 1: +0.1 m/s, Heat 2: +1.0 m/s, Heat 3: +0.6 m/s

Final
Wind: +0.6 m/s

References

200 metres
200 metres at the World Athletics U20 Championships